The Marshall Project is a nonprofit, online journalism organization focusing on issues related to criminal justice in the United States. It was founded by former hedge fund manager Neil Barsky with former New York Times executive editor Bill Keller as its first editor-in-chief. Its website states that it aims to "create and sustain a sense of national urgency about the U.S. criminal justice system." Susan Chira has been editor-in-chief since 2019. It has won the Pulitzer Prize twice.

The organization's name honors Thurgood Marshall, the NAACP's civil rights activist and attorney whose arguments won the landmark U.S. Supreme Court school desegregation case, Brown vs. Board of Education, who later became the first African-American justice of that Court.

History

The Marshall Project began as an idea of Neil Barsky, a former hedge-fund manager, in November 2013. When writing an op-ed in The New York Times, Barsky thought it might be a good opportunity to plug the idea, so he included a brief description of the project and the website URL in his byline. In February 2014, The New York Times reported that Bill Keller, who had been executive editor at The New York Times from July 2003 to September 2011, was going to work for the Marshall Project.

The Marshall Project publishes journalistic and opinion pieces on its own website, and also collaborates with news organizations and magazines to publish investigations. Its first two investigations were published in August 2014 (on its own website and in The Washington Post together) and in October 2014 (on its own website and in Slate). It also publishes a weekly feature called "Life Inside," where people who work or live in the criminal justice system tell their stories in first-person essays. The Marshall Project also now publishes News Inside, a print publication distributed in hundreds of prisons and jails across the United States. 

The project officially launched in November 2014. Its first editor-in-chief was former New York Times executive editor Bill Keller. The outlet's reporting in its first five years garnered it a Pulitzer Prize and other journalism awards, with reporting focused on various issues, including prison abuse and rape, privatized prisons, and the treatment of incarcerated youth and mentally ill people. Keller retired in 2019 and was succeeded as editor-in-chief by Susan Chira.

The Marshall Project and the Associated Press partnered for 15 months to track the number of COVID-19 infections and deaths in federal prisons.  Other recent partners include USA Today and National Public Radio. Reporter Keri Blakinger has a regular column with NBC News.

Organization and funding
As of August 2021, The Marshall Project had a staff of 48, with eight additional contributing writers, five of whom are currently incarcerated.

The Marshall Project is funded by donations and grants from foundations and individuals. As of August 2021, the foundations and individuals listed on the website as supporters include the Annie E. Casey Foundation, Arnold Ventures, Ford Foundation, the Heising-Simons Foundation, the Jacob and Valeria Langeloth Foundation, John D. and Catherine T. MacArthur Foundation, Maverick Capital Foundation, Neil Barsky, Open Society Foundations, Propel, Rockefeller Family Fund, Timothy and Michele Barakett, the Tow Foundation and Trinity Wall Street.

Critical reception
Joe Pompeo wrote of The Marshall Project that it had had a great start due to a mix of good initial publicity and association with high-profile names.

The Marshall Project has also been identified as part of a new and experimental non-profit journalism format. It has been compared with the non-profit ProPublica, the Center for Investigative Reporting, Inside Climate News,  and The Texas Tribune, and also with recent for-profit journalistic experiments such as Vox and FiveThirtyEight.

The Marshall Project has also been praised for its timely launch given current bipartisan interest in criminal justice reform in the United States.

The Marshall Project has been compared with the Innocence Project, but distinguishes itself because its focus is not merely on innocent people ensnared by the criminal justice system but also on guilty people whose rights to due process, fair trial, and proportionate punishment are violated.

Awards and honors
In 2016, The Marshall Project and partner ProPublica won the Pulitzer Prize for Explanatory Reporting for "An Unbelievable Story of Rape" described as "a startling examination and exposé of law enforcement's enduring failures to investigate reports of rape properly and to comprehend the traumatic effects on its victims", as well as a George Polk Award for the same piece. In 2019, this piece was adapted into the Netflix series Unbelievable.

In 2017, The Marshall Project won a National Magazine Award for general excellence in the category of Literature, Science and Politics. This was the website's first National Magazine Award.

Also in 2017, The Marshall Project was named as a collaborator (alongside ProPublica) when This American Life won a Peabody Award for "Anatomy of Doubt".

In 2018, The Marshall Project was awarded a national Edward R. Murrow Award for "Overall Excellence" for a small digital newsroom. It also won the award for General Excellence in Online Journalism from Online News Association. Its 2017 documentary series "We Are Witnesses" was nominated for the 39th Annual News & Documentary Emmy Award. Its 2019 installment of the "We Are Witnesses" series was nominated for the 41st Annual News & Documentary Emmy Award for "Outstanding New Approaches" in the documentary category.

In 2021, the Marshall Project was awarded a Goldsmith Prize for Investigative Reporting for reporting on conditions in the Mississippi penal system. The Marshall Project was awarded the Pulitzer Prize in National Reporting in 2021 for a yearlong investigation into injuries caused by police dog bites. The prize was shared with AL.com, IndyStar and the Invisible Institute.

See also
 Public criminology

References

External links
 

2014 establishments in the United States
American news websites
Criminal justice reform in the United States
Nonprofit newspapers
Thurgood Marshall